Charles O'Neill (March 21, 1821 – November 25, 1893) was an American politician from Pennsylvania who served as a Republican member of the U.S. House of Representatives for Pennsylvania's 2nd congressional district from 1863 to 1871 and from 1873 to 1893.

He served as a member of the Pennsylvania House of Representatives from 1850 to 1852 and from 1860 to 1861.  He served as a member of the Pennsylvania State Senate for the 1st district from 1853 to 1854.

Early life and education
O'Neill was born in Philadelphia, Pennsylvania and attended a Quaker preparatory school.  He graduated from Dickinson College in Carlisle, Pennsylvania in 1840.  He studied law under the future Vice-President of the United States, George M. Dallas and was admitted to the Philadelphia bar in 1843.

Career
He was elected as a Whig to the Pennsylvania House of Representatives and served from 1850 to 1852 and from 1860 to 1861.  He was elected to the Pennsylvania State Senate for the 1st district and served from 1853 to 1854.

In 1862 during the Civil War, he was elected as a Republican to the 38th and to the three succeeding Congresses.  He was an unsuccessful candidate for reelection in 1870 losing to John V. Creely.  He was again elected to the 43rd Congress and served from 1873 until his death in 1893.

He died of tuberculosis in Philadelphia, Pennsylvania and is interred in West Laurel Hill Cemetery in Bala Cynwyd, Pennsylvania.

See also
List of United States Congress members who died in office (1790–1899)

Notes

References
 
 Retrieved on 2009-04-01
The Political Graveyard

|-

|-

1821 births
1893 deaths
19th-century American politicians
19th-century deaths from tuberculosis
Burials at West Laurel Hill Cemetery
Dickinson College alumni
Lawyers from Philadelphia
Members of the Pennsylvania House of Representatives
Pennsylvania state senators
Pennsylvania Whigs
Tuberculosis deaths in Pennsylvania
Politicians from Philadelphia
Republican Party members of the United States House of Representatives from Pennsylvania
19th-century American lawyers